Schubel is a surname. Notable people with the surname include:

Max Schubel (1932–2010), American composer
Rolf Schübel (born 1942), German film director and screenwriter